Herbert Albert Laurens Fisher  (21 March 1865 – 18 April 1940) was an English historian, educator, and Liberal politician. He served as President of the Board of Education in David Lloyd George's 1916 to 1922 coalition government.

Background and education
Fisher was born in London, the eldest son of Herbert William Fisher (1826–1903), author of Considerations on the Origin of the American War and his wife Mary Louisa Jackson (1841–1916).  His sister Adeline Maria Fisher was the first wife of the composer Ralph Vaughan Williams, another sister Florence Henrietta Fisher married both Frederic William Maitland and Francis Darwin. His sister Cordelia Fisher married the author, critic and journalist Richard Curle and was the mother of the academic Adam Curle. Fisher was a first cousin of Virginia Woolf and her sister Vanessa Bell (the children of his mother's sister Julia). He was educated at Winchester and New College, Oxford, where he graduated with a first class degree in 1888 and was awarded a fellowship.

Career
Fisher was a tutor in modern history at the University of Oxford. His publications include Bonapartism (1908), The Republican Tradition in Europe (1911) and Napoleon (1913). In September 1912, he was appointed (with Lord Islington, Lord Ronaldshay, Justice Abdur Rahim, and others) as a member of the Royal Commission on the Public Services in India of 1912–1915. Between 1913 and 1917 he was Vice-Chancellor of the University of Sheffield.

In December 1916 Fisher was elected Member of Parliament for Sheffield Hallam and joined the government of David Lloyd George as President of the Board of Education. He was sworn of the Privy Council the same month. In this post he was instrumental in the formulation of the Education Act 1918, which made school attendance compulsory for children up to the age of 14. Fisher was also responsible for the School Teachers (Superannuation) Act 1918, which provided pension provision for all teachers.

In 1918 he became MP for the Combined English Universities.

Fisher resigned his seat in parliament through appointment as Steward of the Chiltern Hundreds on 15 February 1926, retiring from politics to take up the post of warden of New College, Oxford, which he held until his death. There he published a three-volume History of Europe in 1935. He served on the British Academy, the British Museum, the Rhodes Trustees, the National Trust, the Governing Body of Winchester, the London Library and the BBC. He was awarded the 1927 James Tait Black Memorial Prize for his biography James Bryce, Viscount Bryce of Dechmont, O.M. and received the Order of Merit in 1937.

In 1939 he was appointed first Chairman of the Appellate Tribunal for Conscientious Objectors in England and Wales.

Fisher died in St Thomas's Hospital, London, on 18 April 1940 after having been knocked down by a lorry and seriously injured the previous week, while on his way to sit on a Conscientious Objectors' Tribunal during the blackout. Some of his possessions, including his library and some of his clothing, remained at New College.

In 1943, Operation Mincemeat, a British Intelligence operation to deceive enemy forces, undertook the invention of a false Royal Marines officer, whose body was to be dropped at sea in the hope the false intelligence it carried would be believed.  As the fictitious Major Martin was to be a man of some means, he required quality underwear, but with rationing this was difficult to obtain, and the intelligence officers were unwilling to donate their own.  Fisher's was obtained, and the corpse used in the deception, dressed in Fisher's quality woollen underpants, succeeded in misleading German Intelligence.

Family
Fisher married the economist and historian Lettice Ilbert (1875–1956) in 1899. Their only child was the British academic Mary Bennett.

Portraits
A portrait drawing of Fisher by Catharine Dodgson and an oil portrait by William Nicholson (artist) hang at New College, Oxford. The college also possess a conversation piece by Berthe Noufflard of Fisher, Lettice Ilbert, and Mary Bennett.

See also
 Frederic William Maitland
 Henry James Sumner Maine
 Paul Vinogradoff
 Liberalism in the United Kingdom

Works
 The Medieval Empire, Vol. 2, Macmillan & Co., 1898.
 Studies in Napoleonic Statesmanship: Germany, Oxford: Clarendon Press, 1903.
 The History of England, from the Accession of Henry VII to the Death of Henry VIII, 1485–1547, Longmans, Green & Co., 1906.
 Bonapartism; Six Lectures Delivered in the University of London, Oxford : Clarendon Press, 1908.
 The Republican Tradition in Europe, Methuen & Co., 1911.
 Napoleon, H. Holt and Company, 1913 [1st Pub. 1912].
 Studies in History and Politics, Oxford : The Clarendon Press, 1920.
 The Common Weal, Oxford: The Clarendon Press, 1924.
 James Bryce, 2 vols. London: Macmillan, 1927.
 Our New Religion, Ernest Benn, 1929. An examination of Christian Science.
 A History of Europe, 3 vols. London: Eyre & Spottiswoode, 1935.

Articles
 "Fustel de Coulanges," The English Historical Review, Vol. V, 1890.
 "The Codes" in The Cambridge Modern History, vol. ix, Cambridge: University Press, 1906.
 "The Political Writings of Rousseau," The Edinburgh Review, Vol. CCXXIV, N°. 457, July 1916.
 "The Whig Historians", in Proceedings of the British Academy, n. 14, 1928.
  "A Universal Historian" in The Nineteenth Century and After, vol. 116, no. 694, December, London: Constable, 1934.

Pamphlets
 The Value of Small States, Oxford Pamphlets, N°. 17, Oxford University Press, 1914.
 The British Share in the War, T. Nelson & Sons, 1915.
 Political Prophecies. An Address to the Edinburg Philosophical Society Delivered Nov. 5, 1918, Oxford: Clarendon Press, 1919.
 The Place of the University in National Life, Oxford University Press, 1919.
 Paul Valéry, Oxford, The Clarendon Press, 1927.
 What to Read on Citizenship, Leeds, Jowett & Sowry Ltd., 1928.

References

Further reading
 Judge, Harry. "H. A. L. Fisher: Scholar and Minister," Oxford Review of Education, Vol. 32(1), The university and Public Education: The Contribution of Oxford, Feb. 2006.

External links 

 
 

 

1865 births
1940 deaths
19th-century English historians
20th-century English historians
British Secretaries of State
British Secretaries of State for Education
Liberal Party (UK) MPs for English constituencies
Members of the Privy Council of the United Kingdom
People educated at Winchester College
Alumni of New College, Oxford
Members of the Order of Merit
Academics of the University of Sheffield
Wardens of New College, Oxford
Fellows of the Royal Society (Statute 12)
Road incident deaths in London
Academics from London
Politics of Sheffield
UK MPs 1918–1922
UK MPs 1922–1923
UK MPs 1923–1924
UK MPs 1924–1929
Presidents of the British Academy
James Tait Black Memorial Prize recipients
Members of the Parliament of the United Kingdom for the Combined English Universities
Fellows of the British Academy
National Liberal Party (UK, 1922) politicians
Vice-Chancellors of the University of Sheffield